The Point! is the sixth studio album by American songwriter and musician Harry Nilsson, released in late 1970. It was accompanied by an animated film adaptation directed by Fred Wolf, which aired in early February 1971 on the ABC-TV network. Its lead single, "Me and My Arrow", peaked at number 34 on the Billboard Hot 100.

The Point! is a fable that tells the story of a boy named Oblio, the only round-headed person in the Pointed Village, where by law everyone and everything must have a point. Nilsson explained his inspiration for The Point!: "I was on acid and I looked at the trees and I realized that they all came to points, and the little branches came to points, and the houses came to point. I thought, 'Oh! Everything has a point, and if it doesn't, then there's [still] a point to it.'"

Story

The round-headed Oblio has had to wear a pointed hat since birth to conceal his "pointless" condition from his pointy-headed peers. However, Oblio is accepted in the town despite his nonconformity, until one day, when the son of an evil count is unwittingly dishonored by Oblio. The count's son challenges Oblio to a one-on-one game of Triangle Toss, where participants catch triangles on their heads. Oblio wins with the help of his dog Arrow. In a fit of rage, the count, who wants his son to rule the land one day, confronts the good-hearted but timid king to reaffirm the law of the land, which states that those who are pointless must be banished from the kingdom and into the Pointless Forest. A jury reluctantly convicts both Oblio and Arrow, leaving the king with no choice but to send the pair away.

Oblio and Arrow are sent to the Pointless Forest, but soon discover that even the Pointless Forest has a point. They meet curious creatures like giant bees, a "pointed man" pointing in all directions who proclaims "A point in every direction is the same as no point at all", a man made of rocks, three dancing fat sisters, and a walking, talking tree who helps Oblio see that everyone has a point, though it might not be readily displayed.

Oblio and Arrow spend the night in the Pointless Forest, then awaken to a large stone hand with the finger pointing to their "destination point". They take the road indicated by the hand and make their way back to the Land of Point, where they receive a hero's welcome from the land's citizens, and the king. Oblio begins to tell his story but is interrupted by the furious count, who is then silenced by the king.

Oblio tells the king and the people of the land that everything has a point, including the Pointless Forest, and himself. Angered, the count pulls off Oblio's pointed hat, but is taken aback when he sees a point on top of Oblio's bare head.

Upon this revelation the points of everyone else in the land disappear and pointed buildings become round.

Album

The Point! album, unlike the later film, features Nilsson himself telling the story directly to the listener, providing all the characters' voices as well as the narration.

A small comic book was included with the vinyl record when it was first released. The comic was illustrated by Gary Lund, who was also the production designer of the animated film.

A Deluxe CD of the album was released with demos and a bonus track on November 19, 2002, by BMG Heritage.

Track listing

Charts

Animated television film

Production

The Point, an animated adaptation of the story, first aired February 2, 1971, and was the first animated feature ever to air in prime time on US television; it appeared on the ABC television network as an ABC Movie of the Week. The film was directed by Fred Wolf and produced by Murakami-Wolf Films in association with Nilsson House Music. In this version, there is a framing device of a father telling his son the fable as a bedtime story. In its initial airing, the voice of the father was provided by a friend of Nilsson's, Dustin Hoffman, who agreed to take $20,000 for his narration to be used on one broadcast, so for later airings of the film, the narration had to be re-recorded. The initial re-recording was done by actor Alan Barzman. The VHS and DVD releases feature another of Nilsson's friends, Ringo Starr, as the father. Another version, seen on cable television in the '80s and '90s, featured narration by Alan Thicke. The voices of Oblio and the narrator's son were provided by Mike Lookinland, best known for playing Bobby Brady on the television series The Brady Bunch.

A 50th anniversary Blu-ray edition of the animated version (with the Ringo Starr narration) was released in February 2020.

Voice cast

 Dustin Hoffman as Narrator/Father (first telecast)
 Alan Barzman as Narrator/Father (second telecast)
 Alan Thicke as Narrator/Father (third telecast)
 Ringo Starr as Narrator/Father (home video releases)
 Paul Frees as Oblio's Father/Pointed Man's Right Head/King/Leaf Man/Villagers
 June Foray as Pointed Man's Middle Head
 Unknown as Pointed Man's Left Head
 Lennie Weinrib as Count
 William E. Martin as Rock Man
 Buddy Foster as Count's Son
 Joan Gerber as Oblio's Mother
 Mike Lookinland as Oblio

Musical play

In the mid-1970s, Esquire Jauchem, artistic director of the Boston Repertory Theater, adapted and directed a stage musical version that starred 18-year-old David Morse as Oblio. The production later toured to the Trinity Repertory Company in Providence. In 1991, Nilsson gave Jauchem permission to remount his adaptation of The Point! at the Chapel Court Theatre in Hollywood, run by Richard and Tamara Merson, who had been involved in the Mermaid Theatre production in London as well.

In 1977, a stage adaptation of The Point! was presented at the Mermaid Theatre in London. Featured in the cast were Davy Jones and Micky Dolenz, both former members of the band The Monkees and long-time friends of Nilsson. In order to accommodate the expansion of The Point! to a full-length musical, other Nilsson songs from various points in his career were incorporated. An original cast album was released in the United Kingdom by MCA. A CD version was released by Varèse Sarabande on July 1, 2016, under license from Geffen, which controls the MCA Records catalogue via Universal Music.

London credits

Cast

 Davy Jones as Oblio
 Micky Dolenz as Count's Kid and The Leafman
 Colin Bennett as The Count
 David Claridge as Arrow
 Veronica Clifford as Oblio's Mum, Balloon Lady
 Noel Howlett as The King
 Julia Lewis as Oblio's Girlfriend
 Clovissa Newcombe as Count's Lady, The Pointed Man
 Mark Penfold as The Pointed Man
 Felix Rice as The Rockman
 Chrissy Roberts as Balloon Lady
 Denny Ryder as The Pointed Man
 Roy Sampson as Oblio's Dad
 Gary Taylor as Balloon Man, New Bird

Backing vocals were provided by Anna Macleod, Richard Barnes, and Jean Gilbert.

Crew

 Directed by Colin Bennett
 Original adaptation by Ron Pember and Bernard Miles
 Designed by Peter Whiteman
 Lighting by Peter Sutton
 Choreography by Gillian Gregory
 Musical director Mike McNaught

Track listing, original cast recording

All titles were written by Harry Nilsson, except "Thursday" (Nilsson, Danny Kortchmar).
 Overture – Orchestra
 "Everything's Got 'Em" – Company
 "Me and My Arrow" – Davy Jones
 "Poli High" – Company
 "Remember" – Veronica Clifford
 "To Be a King" – Noel Howlett and Company
 "He's Leaving Here This Morning (Bath)" – Micky Dolenz, Colin Bennett, Clovissa Newcombe
 "Think About Your Troubles" – Davy Jones and Company
 "Blanket for a Sail" – Davy Jones
 "Life Line" – Davy Jones'
 "Thursday (Here's Why I Did Not Go to Work Today)" – Felix Rice
 "It's a Jungle Out There" – Micky Dolenz
 "P.O.V. Waltz" – Davy Jones and Company
 "Are You Sleeping? (Song Title)" – Davy Jones and Company
 "Gotta Get Up" – Davy Jones, Micky Dolenz
 Reprise Overture – Orchestra

References

External links
 
 The Point! at HarryNilsson.com

ABC Movie of the Week
Harry Nilsson albums
1971 albums
Albums arranged by George Tipton
RCA Records albums
Rock operas
Fictional counts and countesses
West End musicals
1977 musicals